The UK Startup Awards, sponsored by NatWest, BlackBerry and Business Link, rewards the most successful business start-ups in the UK and is recognised and respected as such throughout the business community. Judges for 2011 included the entrepreneurs Robert Craven, Lara Morgan and Colin Wilkinson.

References

External links

 The UK Startup Awards

Startup Awards
Business in the United Kingdom